Sovereign is a skyscraper in Metrotown, Burnaby, British Columbia, Canada, designed and built by Bosa Properties Inc. on Willingdon Avenue and Kingsway. It has 45 storeys which include hotel and residence space.

Sovereign has 202 luxury residences in the upper part of the structure and 169 hotel rooms in the lower part. It also includes  of retail space.

See also
List of tallest buildings in Burnaby
List of tallest buildings in British Columbia

References 

Buildings and structures in Burnaby
Skyscraper hotels in Canada
Residential skyscrapers in Canada
Retail buildings in Canada